Afghanistan competed at the 2017 World Championships in Athletics in London, United Kingdom, between 4 and 13 August 2017, with sole athlete Said Gilani competing in the men's 100 metres.

Results
(q – qualified, NM – no mark, SB – season best)

Men 
Track and road events

References 

Nations at the 2017 World Championships in Athletics
World Championships in Athletics
Afghanistan at the World Championships in Athletics